The fourth Cabinet of Prime Minister Nikola Gruevski is the Republic of Macedonia Government cabinet announced on 19 June 2014. It is the 11th cabinet of the Republic of Macedonia. Gruevski's second cabinet was formed following the April 2014 election won by the right-wing VMRO-DPMNE.

Parties included in the government:
Internal Macedonian Revolutionary Organization – Democratic Party for Macedonian National Unity (VMRO-DPMNE)
Democratic Union for Integration (DUI/BDI)
United Party for Emancipation (OPE)

After the 2015 protests and according to the Przino Agreement, in November 2015 the two members of the Social Democratic Union of Macedonia (SDSM) were entered into the government.

List of ministers and portfolios

External links
Official website of the Government of the Republic of Macedonia

References

Gruevski, 4
2014 establishments in the Republic of Macedonia
Cabinets established in 2014
Cabinets disestablished in 2017